The York County School Division or YCSD  is a school division (school district) in York County, Virginia, United States. The division consists of approximately 12,750 students in 19 schools, of which there are 10 elementary schools, 4 middle schools, 4 high schools, and 1 charter school. The division employs about 1,050 instructional staff members and over 730 support staff members.

Governance 
York County School Division is run by a five-member School Board of elected officials, one from each of the county's five election districts. The policies of the School Board are implemented by a superintendent.

School Board 

 Mark J. Shafer
 Brett Higginbotham
 Laurel M. Garrelts (Chair)
 James E. Richardson
 Sean P. Myatt (Vice Chair)

Superintendent 
The superintendent of the York County School Division is Dr. Victor D. Shandor. Prior to being appointed in 2014, he was an area superintendent for the Fulton County School System and the Exceptional Children's Programs director for Cabarrus County Schools.

Schools

Elementary schools 
 Bethel Manor Elementary School
 Coventry Elementary School
 Dare Elementary School
 Grafton Bethel Elementary School
 Magruder Elementary School
 Mt. Vernon Elementary School
 Seaford Elementary School
 Tabb Elementary School
 Waller Mill Elementary School
 Yorktown Elementary School

Middle schools 
 Grafton Middle School
 Queens Lake Middle School
 Tabb Middle School
 Yorktown Middle School

High schools
 Bruton High School
 Grafton High School
 Tabb High School
 York High School

Charter school 
 York River Academy

References

External links
 

School divisions in Virginia
School Division